Opsilia badenkoi is a species of beetle from the family Cerambycidae native to Kazakhstan.

References

Beetles described in 1988
Beetles of Asia
badenkoi
Endemic fauna of Kazakhstan